Lotte Rod (born 10 June 1985 in Aarhus) is a Danish politician, who is a member of the Folketing for the Social Liberal Party. She was elected into parliament at the 2011 Danish general election.

Political career
Rod was first elected into parliament at the 2011 election, and was reelected in 2015 and 2019. In 2020 it was revealed that leader of the Social Liberal Party Morten Østergaard had sexually harassed Rod. This case eventually led to Østergaard resigning as party leader and later also resigning his seat in parliament.

References

External links 
 Biography on the website of the Danish Parliament (Folketinget)

1985 births
Living people
People from Aarhus
Danish Social Liberal Party politicians
21st-century Danish women politicians
Women members of the Folketing
Members of the Folketing 2011–2015
Members of the Folketing 2015–2019
Members of the Folketing 2019–2022
20th-century Danish women
Members of the Folketing 2022–2026